Muskoka—Ontario was a federal electoral district represented in the House of Commons of Canada from 1925 to 1949. It was located in the province of Ontario. This riding was created in 1924 from parts of Muskoka and Ontario North ridings.

It initially consisted of the territorial district of Muskoka and the part of the county of Ontario lying north of and including the township of Uxbridge and north of but excluding the township of Reach.

The electoral district was abolished in 1947 when it was redistributed between Ontario, Parry Sound—Muskoka, Simcoe East and Victoria ridings.

Members of Parliament

This riding elected the following members of the House of Commons of Canada:

Election results

|}

|}

|}

|}

|}

|}

See also 

 List of Canadian federal electoral districts
 Past Canadian electoral districts

External links 
 Riding history from Library of Parliament website

Former federal electoral districts of Ontario